The 1966 Australian Championships was a tennis tournament that took place on outdoor Grass courts at the White City Tennis Club, Sydney, Australia from 21 to 31 January. It was the 54th edition of the Australian Championships (now known as the Australian Open), the 15th held in Sydney, and the first Grand Slam tournament of the year. The singles titles were won by Australians Roy Emerson and Margaret Smith.

Champions

Men's singles

 Roy Emerson defeated  Arthur Ashe  6–4, 6–8, 6–2, 6–3

Women's singles

 Margaret Smith defeated  Nancy Richey  walkover

Men's doubles
 Roy Emerson /  Fred Stolle defeated   John Newcombe /  Tony Roche, 7–9, 6–3, 6–8, 14–12, 12–10

Women's doubles
 Carole Graebner /  Nancy Richey defeated  Margaret Smith /  Lesley Turner, 6–4, 7–5

Mixed doubles
 Judy Tegart /  Tony Roche  defeated   Robyn Ebbern /  Bill Bowrey, 6–1, 6–3

References

External links
 Australian Open official website

 
1966 in Australian tennis
1967
January 1966 sports events in Australia
1966,Australian Championships